This is a list containing the episodes of The Transformers, an animated television series depicting a war among the Autobots and Decepticons who could transform into vehicles, other objects and animals. Written and recorded in America, the series was animated in Japan and later South Korea. The entire series was based upon the line of transforming toys originally created by Japanese toy manufacturer Takara, which were developed into the Transformers line by American company Hasbro.

In the United States, the show aired a total of 98 episodes between 1984 and 1987. The episodes are ordered chronologically by broadcast date. Order # is the correct chronological story order for the episodes, which aired out of order.

Series overview

Generation 1

Season 1 (1984)

Season 2 (1985–86)

The Transformers: The Movie (1986) 

The Transformers: The Movie is a 1986 animated feature film. It was released in North America on August 8, 1986. Set to an upbeat rock music soundtrack, the movie has a decidedly darker tone than the television series, with detailed visuals in Toei Animation's typical animated feature film styling. The film features several grand battles in which a handful of major characters die.

Season 3 (1986–87)

Season 4 (1987) 
Season 4's title sequence was made of parts from the others and TV commercials with Season 3 music.

Epilogue 
Season 4 is the end of the American series. The Transformers continued in Japan as Transformers: The Headmasters with 35 new episodes, however, it ignores the events of "The Rebirth" and is set in a different continuity. A fifth season was aired in the United States, but consisted entirely of re-runs of previous episodes being told as stories by Powermaster Optimus Prime.

Japanese seasons 
Following the conclusion of the third season, Japan opted not to import the fourth season, but instead created a series of new animated shows to continue the story, beginning with Transformers: The Headmasters in 1987, and continuing into Transformers: Super-God Masterforce in 1988, Transformers: Victory in 1989, and the single-episode direct-to-video OVA Transformers: Zone in 1990.

Scramble City 
Scramble City was a special direct-to-video episode produced for the Japanese market, released in April 1986. It served to further promote the new "combiner" figures who had been introduced at the end of season 2, and a few other figures from the 1986 product line (like Ultra Magnus, Metroplex and Trypticon) who had not yet appeared in the American cartoon, which were all being released in Japan with the sub-branding of "Scramble City."

Set soon after the end of the second season, the episode focuses on the Autobots' efforts to construct a new mobile fortress, the titular "Scramble City." When the Decepticons learn of this, their combiner robots are deployed to attack, and a battle between them and their Autobot counterparts ensues, focusing on their "Scramble Power" – the interchangeability of the individual limbs – to the extent that at one point, Breakdown of the Stunticons connects to Superion to damage him. At the episode's conclusion, Scramble City is activated and assumes its robot mode of Metroplex to rout the Decepticons. However, from the ocean depths, the Decepticons' own city, Trypticon, rises.

Generation 2 

Generation 2 episodes were all taken from the Generation 1 television series which had been previously produced, but with added effects and editing. These episodes aired between 1993 and 1995.

See also 
 List of Transformers animated series

References

External links 
 
 
 Transformers at Cartoon Encyclopedia
 Screen captures from the Transformers Cartoon on Seibertron.com
 http://www.portents.com/marek/transformers/tfepgd.txt

Lists of American children's animated television series episodes
Transformers episodes